The World Group Play-offs for the 1992 Federation Cup was held from 16–17 July at the Waldstadion T.C. in Frankfurt, Germany, on clay courts.

The sixteen teams that were defeated in the first round of the World Group played off a two-stage knockout round, with the four teams winning two matches remaining in the World Group for 1993.

Draw

First round

Mexico vs. Indonesia

Belgium vs. South Africa

Hungary vs. Italy

Romania vs. Bulgaria

Switzerland vs. Israel

Paraguay vs. New Zealand

Great Britain vs. Chile

Finland vs. China

Play-off Round

Mexico vs. South Africa

Hungary vs. Bulgaria

Switzerland vs. Paraguay

Great Britain vs. Finland

References

External links
 Fed Cup website

World Group Play-offs
Tennis tournaments in Germany
Sports competitions in Frankfurt